Glen Street is a station along the Oyster Bay Branch of the Long Island Rail Road. It is located on Glen Street (former NY 107), near Elm Avenue, in the City of Glen Cove, New York.

History

Glen Street station was built by the Glen Cove Branch Rail Road (an LIRR subsidiary) and opened on May 16, 1867, as the original Glen Cove Station, having finally reached the intended destination of the railroad's namesake. It was the terminus of the branch until the line was extended to Locust Valley in 1869. Glen Cove's first railroad station was located to the northwest of the current station on the land now occupied by a Burger King. It was replaced in 1888. While it is not listed on the National Register of Historic Places (like nearby Sea Cliff Railroad Station), it has been listed as a New York State historic landmark since 1967.

Station layout
This station has two high-level side platforms, each long enough for one and a half cars to receive and discharge passengers. A small freight yard existed on the east bound side of the tracks, which is now occupied by a racket club.

References

External links 

June 2006 Photo (Unofficial Long Island Railroad History Website)
 Glen Cove (old Nassau) and Glen Street Stations (Sam Berliner III's Victorian Stations of the LIRR)

Long Island Rail Road stations in Nassau County, New York
Glen Cove, New York
Railway stations in the United States opened in 1867
1867 establishments in New York (state)